Ben Saunders (born 25 December 1991) was an Australian rules footballer who played for South Fremantle in the West Australian Football League (WAFL). He was the club's leading goalkicker in 2012, 2014 and 2016. He won the Bernie Naylor Medal  in 2012, 2014 and 2016, and the state game Simpson Medal in 2017.

References

External links 
Ben Saunder's profile at WAFL Online

1991 births
Living people
Australian rules footballers from Western Australia
Claremont Football Club players
South Fremantle Football Club players
People from Mount Barker, Western Australia